Sherry Anderson (born January 6, 1964) is a Canadian curler from Delisle, Saskatchewan. She is a two-time winner of the World Senior Curling Championships for Canada.

Career
Anderson has been to ten Scotties Tournament of Hearts, six as a skip. She qualified for her first Hearts by winning the 1994 Saskatchewan women's championship, defeating Leanne Whitrow in the final, 7–4. At the 1994 Scott Tournament of Hearts, her team lost in the semi-final. Anderson won her second provincial title in 1995, defeating Michelle Schneider (Englot) in the final, 7–5.   At the 1995 Scott Tournament of Hearts, she finished out of the playoffs with a 6-5 record. At the 2000 Scott Tournament of Hearts, Anderson was the alternate for June Campbell. Anderson returned to the Scotts as a skip at the 2002 Scott Tournament of Hearts. There, her team of Kim Hodson, Sandra Mulroney and Donna Gignac lost in the final to Colleen Jones. Two years later, Anderson finished 7-4 at the 2004 Scott Tournament of Hearts.  In 2004, Anderson was awarded the Marj Mitchell Sportsmanship Award at the Tournament of Hearts.

In 2010, Anderson joined team Stefanie Lawton to play as her third. She played with Lawton until 2014, at which point she took over the team for one season.

Anderson has won the Canadian Senior Curling Championships a record five-straight times, in 2017, 2018, 2019, 2021 and 2022. She won a gold medal for Canada at the 2018 and 2019 World Senior Curling Championships.

Personal life

Anderson is an owner/partner of C&S Promotions. She is married and has three stepchildren.

Grand Slam record

Former events

References

External links

Canadian women curlers
Living people
1964 births
Sportspeople from Prince Albert, Saskatchewan
Curlers from Saskatchewan
Continental Cup of Curling participants
Canada Cup (curling) participants
21st-century Canadian women